
The following lists events that happened during 1834 in South Africa.

Events
 15 January - John Herschel, an English mathematician and astronomer, arrives in Cape Town with his twenty-foot-long telescope 
 21 December Xhosa armies attack the eastern regions of the Cape Colony starting the 6th Cape Frontier War that only ends in 1836
 The emancipation of the estimated 39,000 slaves in the colony
 The Bo-Kaap (Upper Cape) in the colony is established by Muslim ex-slaves
 The colony's Legislative Council is formed
 The Berlin Mission Society establishes a station at Bethulie
 The Anglican St. John's Church is built in Bathurst
 King William's Town is founded.

Births
 20 January - Petrus Jacobus Joubert, a South African Republic Triumvirate member, is born near Cango in the  Oudtshoorn district of Cape Colony
 15 April - Thomas François Burgers, the 4th state president  of the South African Republic, is born on Langefontein farm in the Camdeboo district of Graaff-Reinet, Cape Colony

References
See Years in South Africa for list of References

 
South Africa
Years in South Africa